The Newcastle Agri Terminal (NAT) is an intermodal dry bulk cargo port operator located in Carrington, New South Wales. It is located within the Carrington Precinct of the Port of Newcastle utilising the Dyke 2 berth.

Facilities
The terminal's facilities include two 20,000 tonne and three 6,780 tonne silos equating to 60,340 metric tonnes storage, rail receival via the Bullock Island loop line, conveyors, control rooms, carpark, laboratory, inspection and sample rooms and the ability to load Panamax vessels at 2,000 tonnes per hour. Dyke 2 berth, which can accommodate vessels up to 40,000 DWT with maximum beam of 26 metres, is owned by Newcastle Port Corporation while the bulk loader and storage facilities is owned by Aurizon.

Ownership
The founding investors in NAT included Agrex, CBH Group, CTC Terminals, Glencore Xstrata and Olam Grain Australia.<ref>Silos at Newcastle Agri Terminal ABC News</ref> In August 2021, NAT was purchased by Qube Holdings from CBH Group, CTC Terminals, Riverina and Viterra.Qube Holdings to buy Newcastle Agri Terminal for $90million Newcastle Herald 9 September 2021

Operations
The first bulk grain shipment through the Terminal was 28,000 tonnes of durum wheat loaded onto the MV North Princess'' on 21 February 2014 which was sent to Algeria on behalf of the Australian Durum Company.

References

External links

Agriculture companies of Australia
CBH Group
Companies based in Newcastle, New South Wales
Economy of Newcastle, New South Wales
Glencore
Grain companies
Grain industry of Australia
Qube Holdings
2009 establishments in Australia